Kimberly Schmidt may refer to

 Kimmy Schmidt, titular character of the Netflix original series Unbreakable Kimmy Schmidt
 Kimberly Schmidt (water polo) (born 1983), South African water polo player